"Torture" is the second single released off the album Victory by the band The Jacksons. Written by Jackie Jackson and fellow Motown veteran Kathy Wakefield, the song is about someone ending a relationship and the torture that the member of the relationship, who is still in love with the other person, can feel. Jackie was originally going to sing the song with his brother, Michael, but Jackie's role instead went to Jermaine Jackson, whose availability for the album was in question until the last minute. The rest of the Jacksons sang the chorus along with Michael, Jermaine and Jackie.

The song received mixed reactions from critics. The video was probably best known for Michael not being available, and the use of a wax dummy in his place throughout the video. Paula Abdul replaced Perri Lister as the video's choreographer, in which various scenes of torture are displayed with the Jacksons being on the receiving end of most of it. The shoot was an expensive and arduous affair that neither Michael nor Jermaine took part in, and it ultimately bankrupted the production company. The song peaked at #17 on the Billboard Hot 100 chart, making it the second best selling single on the album, behind "State of Shock". It also peaked at #26 on the UK charts. This was their last single to reach the US Top 40.

Writing and recording
"Torture" was written by Jackie Jackson. Motown writer Kathy Wakefield also helped in the writing. Originally Jackie was going to record the vocals along with Michael. However, Jermaine Jackson sang vocals in Jackie's place, because he did not know if he'd be fully involved with the Victory album until the last minute. On the recording, Michael and Jermaine sing a duet, with the rest of the group providing backing vocals. "Torture" was Jermaine's only main contribution to the Victory album. The B-side of the single was an instrumental version of the song.

One misconception is that the lyrics are about sadomasochism and physical torture, claims that Susan Baker of the Parents Music Resource Center had at one time made. The lyrics to the song are about a relationship that is about to end, and how the feelings of love become "torture" when a break-up is nearing. One of the members of the relationship is still in love with the other and feels that the break-up is "torture".

Music video
In the video various acts of torture are displayed, and various members of the band are usually on the receiving end. At some points the video looks like a horror movie. At a later point a group of skeletons—that are supposed to represent the Jacksons—are shown dancing. Neither Michael nor Jermaine appears in the video: Michael was busy with other obligations, and Jermaine refused to be in the video. The rest of the group decided to shoot the video without them.

Jeff Stein was the director, and Bryce Walmsley the scenic designer. Jackie Jackson also oversaw the production, acting as an advisor. The dancing skeletons were animated at Peter Wallach Enterprises.

Stein recalls the shoot as "an experience that lived up to the song title", and that sentiment is shared by others involved in the production. It finished over schedule and over budget. By the end the Jacksons themselves had stopped showing up. Stein says it was so stressful that one of his crew members lost control of her bodily functions. "The crew motto used to be 'Death or victory'," he says. "I think that was the only time we ever prayed for death."

After Michael had sketched out his ideas for the shoot at a meeting with the production company and his brothers, Stein and producer John Diaz had a feeling he would skip the actual shoot, so they rented a wax dummy of Michael from Madame Tussaud's museum in Nashville. "[It] was put through the wringer," Stein says. "Its head ended up in the salad bowl at lunch one day." The dummy was ultimately used in three separate sequences, including the ending sequence that shows the rest of the group standing in a shot similar to the album cover. The television show PM Magazine later discovered the dummy had been used through a close analysis of the video. "I was so young and naïve, I just figured this is what they normally do in music videos," recalls Paula Abdul, who eventually became the choreographer.

She replaced Perri Lister, an alumna of the British dance troupe Hot Gossip, who had choreographed and/or danced in many early 1980s videos, including playing the bride in "White Wedding" for her boyfriend at the time, Billy Idol. Lister and Stein had worked together before and the Jacksons approved her. A few days afterwards Field told her that Jackie wanted his girlfriend, who he said was a dancer herself, to be in the video. She auditioned and Lister decided she was sufficiently talented to hire, putting her in a group of similarly-built women so her short stature and plumpness would be less noticeable.

Jackie's girlfriend—who Lister did not know was Abdul—did not show up once rehearsals started, so Lister decided to go on without her. A few days later, however, according to Field, Jackie told him Lister wasn't right for the Jacksons. After a week Jackie and Abdul showed up at rehearsals, and Stein privately told Lister that Jackie had indicated that his girlfriend wanted to choreograph the video. She took her check and left.

Abdul, a Laker Girl at the time, took over as the choreographer from that point. She said some of the members of the band approached her after attending a Laker game and asked if she wanted to choreograph their video. "My only problem was how to tell the Jacksons how to dance," Abdul later recalled. "Imagine me telling them what routines to do. I was young, I was scared. I'm not quite sure how I got through that." The success of the choreography in the video helped lead to Abdul's then new career of choreographer in music videos. It was also due to the success of the video that she was chosen to be the choreographer for the Jacksons' Victory tour.

Filming took place at Kaufman Astoria Studios in Queens, New York. On the first day Stein told his crew that since the Jacksons were devout Jehovah's Witnesses, no drugs or alcohol would be tolerated on the set. Shortly thereafter he was looking for two of them he needed for a sequence. Behind a cyclorama he saw them in 30-foot-high silhouette "shoveling something into their nostrils. I ran the length of two football fields, kicked over the lights and no one ever saw it but me."

Paul Flattery, a producer with the Picture Music International production company, blames the handling of this video by producer Diaz and director Stein for driving the company into bankruptcy. "I'll take the blame for many things, but not that video," Stein responds. "We were constantly waiting around for everybody to be ready. It was endless. I don't even know if there was a budget . . . I do not know what it ended up costing."

Reception
Reception for the song was mixed. The Philadelphia Inquirer said that the song was "a hard-rock dance tune with blaring synthesizers and buzzing guitars." The reviewer, however, didn't like the song, summing it up with one word: "Yawn." The Sacramento Bee complimented Jackie Jackson for being the only person "besides Michael" to "rise above the generic," citing "Torture" as one of the two songs by Jackie that were more than exceptional on the album.
William Ruhlmann of Allmusic considered the song a "Track pick", and mentioned that its  popularity probably had to do more with the fact that Michael Jackson was involved. "So, here one has the ludicrous situation of an album in which Marlon Jackson has as prominent a role as Michael Jackson. That's how it sounded to listeners in 1984, anyway, and they weren't fooled — "State of Shock", on which Michael shared vocals with Mick Jagger, was a gold Top Ten hit, and "Torture", which teamed Michael with Jermaine, made the Top 40, while the album went platinum. But the tracks by other group members went virtually ignored," Ruhlmann said.

In popular culture
The video makes an appearance in the season 2 episode of Beavis and Butt-Head titled "At the Sideshow."

Personnel
 Jermaine Jackson – lead and background vocals
 Michael Jackson – lead and background vocals
 Jackie Jackson – ad lib vocals, background vocals, arrangements, horn arrangements
 Randy Jackson – background vocals, keyboards, synthesizers, percussion
 Marlon Jackson – background vocals
 Tito Jackson – background vocals, guitar
 John Barnes – Fairlight computerized keyboard
 Michael Boddicker – keyboards, synthesizers, synth horns, synth programming
 David Ervin – additional synth programming
 Jeff Porcaro – drums
 Jack Wargo – guitar solo
 Jerry Hey – trumpet, horn arrangements
 Bill Bottrell – engineer, mixing
 Paul Erickson, Mitch Gibson, Bino Espinoza – assistant engineers
 Nelson Hayes – project coordinator

Charts

References

1984 singles
The Jackson 5 songs
Vocal collaborations
Songs written by Jackie Jackson
Songs written by Kathy Wakefield
1984 songs
Epic Records singles